Ruinart may refer to:

 Thierry Ruinart (1657–1709), French Benedictine monk and scholar
 Ruinart (Champagne), the oldest established Champagne house, exclusively producing champagne since 1729